On 15 March 1801, royal assent was given for establishing the city and parish of Kingston, Jamaica as a corporation, with a mayor, aldermen, and council (Geo. III c. 29 p. 144). The first election took place November 15, 1802. Below is a list of mayors of Kingston since 1802:

 John Jaques (1802–1809)
 George Kinghorne (1809–1823)
 Joseph Barnes (1823–1829)
 Thomas Yates (1829–1833)
 Hector Mitchell (1833–1853)
 Philip Lawrence (1853–1854)
 Edward Jordon (1854–1868)
 Lewis Bowerbank (1868–1870)
 John S. Brown (1871–1872), Custos
 Henry J. Kemble (1873–1885), Custos
 James Scott (1885–1886)
 Wellesley Bourke (1886–1888)
 Richard Jackson (1888–1889)
 James Ogilvie (1889–1895)
 Samuel Hammond Watson (1895–1896)
 Philip Stern (1896–1898)
 Adrian Robinson (1899–1902)
 George Eustace Burke (1903–1903)
 Charles Walter Tait (1904–1907)
 George Paton Myers (1910-1911)
 Robert William Bryant (1911–1912) 
 Hubert A. L. Simpson, OBE (1913–1916)
 Robert William Bryant (1917–1923)
 Hubert A. L. Simpson, OBE (1923–1924), Commissioner
 Altamont daCosta (1925–1927)
 Sir George Seymour (1931–1934)
 Oswald Anderson (1937–1938)
 William Seivright (1944–1946)
 Geoffrey Gunter (1946–1947)
 Alexander Bustamante (1947–1948)
 Lynden Newland (1948–1951)
 Ken Hill (1951– )
 George McFarlane (1951–1958)
 Iris King (1958–1960)
 [[Frank Emanuel Spaulding, Sr (Business Man and Politician)|Frank Emanuel Spaulding, Sr. (1960-1969)
 Eric Bell (1969–1970)
 Emerson Barrett (1970–1971)
 Eli Matalon (1971–1973)
 Ralph Brown (1974–1977)
 George Mason (1977–1978)
 Arthur Jones (1978–1981)
 Ryan Peralto (1981–1982)
 Colleen Yap (1982–1984)
 Edward Miller (1984–1985), Administrator
 Ralph Brown (1986–1989)
 Marie Atkins (1989–2003)
 Desmond McKenzie (2003–2012)
 Angela Brown-Burke (2012–2016)
 Delroy Williams (2016– )

References

mayors of Kingston